Lewis Stevenson (born 30 July 1989) is a former professional Australian rules footballer who played for the West Coast Eagles and Port Adelaide Football Club in the Australian Football League (AFL).

Career

West Coast
Stevenson was drafted in the 1st round (12th overall) of the 2007 AFL Rookie Draft by West Coast. He did not play a game in his first two seasons on the roster, but was retained for a third year, following a change in the rookie list rules to allow this.

He played 10 senior WAFL games in 2008 and 20 in 2009.

Stevenson made his AFL debut in round 5, 2010 against Sydney, after being elevated to the senior list. He played 10 games in 2010, but did not manage to play a senior game in 2011 or 2012.

Port Adelaide
During the 2012 trade week, Stevenson was traded to Port Adelaide. He made his debut for Port Adelaide in Round 1, 2013 against Melbourne. He was delisted at the end of the 2014 season.

Post-AFL

Stevenson played for Sydney Uni in the 2015 NEAFL season and was named in the competition's Team of the Year.

References

External links

1989 births
Living people
Claremont Football Club players
Australian rules footballers from Western Australia
People educated at Trinity College, Perth
Port Adelaide Football Club players
Port Adelaide Football Club players (all competitions)
West Coast Eagles players
Sydney University Australian National Football Club players